The flag of Caribbean Netherlands island of Sint Eustatius (Statia)  consists of a blue field, red fimbriations, and in the center, a white diamond with a silhouette of the island.  The flag was designed by Zuwena Suares and adopted on 29 July 2004 to be put into use on 16 November of that year (Statia Day).  Since 2010, it has been the official flag of the special municipality of Sint Eustatius.

Description
The flag is rectangular with the colors blue, red, white, gold and green, and divided in four five-sided blue polygons, each fimbriated red.  In its center is a diamond-form white field; in the diamond is the silhouette of the island in green. In the center in the top of the diamond is a five-pointed golden/yellow star.

The colours of the flag each have their own meaning. The gold star represents unity, the four blue polygons represent the ocean that surrounds St. Eustasius, the Green shows the Quill, the red represents the Delonix regia, a flamboyant tree which was used by slaves to celebrate Emancipation Day, the white diamond in the center represents a once diamond water fall which is referred to in the national anthem, "Golden Rock".

Notes

References

Flag
Flags of the Netherlands Antilles
Sint Eustatius